Temoh Station is a small town in Tapah, Batang Padang District, Perak, Malaysia. Formerly there was a major railway station located here, which Temoh Station got its name. The railway station was closed in 1980. One can go here via the Jalan Temoh (Perak state route ) from Temoh, 3 km from here.

Batang Padang District
Towns in Perak